Kiana Rose Elliott (born ) is an Australian weightlifter, competing in the 69 kg category and representing Australia at international competitions. 

Elliott was a promising gymnast, starting at the age of six. However, injuries caused her to give up the sport at the age of 14 and concentrate on weightlifting.

She has competed at world championships, including at the 2015 World Weightlifting Championships. She won the gold medal at the 2016 Oceania Weightlifting Championships.

Elliott represented Australia at the 2020 Summer Olympics in Tokyo, Japan. She competed in the women's 64 kg. She finished 5th in the Snatch and 11th in the Clean & Jerk.

She is coached by Martin Harlowe.

Major results

References

External links

https://www.awf.com.au/statistics/lifter/id/1740
https://www.youtube.com/watch?v=TxXC9BdAM4A

1997 births
Living people
Australian female weightlifters
Place of birth missing (living people)
Weightlifters at the 2014 Summer Youth Olympics
People educated at Abbotsleigh
Weightlifters at the 2020 Summer Olympics
Olympic weightlifters of Australia
Weightlifters at the 2022 Commonwealth Games
21st-century Australian women